Steingaden Abbey (German: Kloster Steingaden) was a Premonstratensian monastery in Steingaden in Bavaria, Germany.

History

Dedicated to John the Baptist, the abbey was founded in 1147 as a Premonstratensian house by Welf VI, third son of Henry the Black, Duke of Bavaria, and brother of Duke Henry the Proud. The first monks and their abbot came from the Premonstratensian Rot an der Rot Abbey. The Romanesque abbey church was dedicated in 1176. Between 1470 and 1491 the abbey buildings were refurbished under Abbot Caspar Suiter in the Late Gothic style.  Welf VI and his son Welf VII were both buried here.

The abbey was looted and burnt in 1525 during the German Peasants' War, and was later almost completely destroyed in the Thirty Years' War. Reconstruction was completed in 1663 under Abbot Augustin Bonenmayr in the style of the early Baroque. During the 1740s the nave of the church was redecorated in the Rococo style.

The abbey's prestigious building projects, combined with its inaccessible location, brought it into financial difficulties which remained insuperable to the end of its existence.

Dissolution

Steingaden Abbey was dissolved in 1803 during the secularisation of Bavaria. The monastic buildings were bought at auction by the Meyer brothers from Aarau, who demolished them in 1819, except for the wing containing the Romanesque cloisters.

Welfenmünster

The former abbey church, the Welfenmünster, dedicated to Saint John the Baptist, is a Romanesque building of the 1170s under an extravagant Rococo refurbishment carried out by Johann Georg Bergmüller throughout the whole of the 1740s. It survived the dissolution as the parish church of Steingaden, which it remains.

The abbey church was the place of burial of the founder, Welf VI, who died in 1191, and his son Welf VII, who predeceased his father in 1167. Their elaborate tomb was destroyed in 1525. The church retained however a carved sandstone panel of the Welf arms, dating from about 1200 which may well have formed part of the destroyed tomb. Apart from seals and seal impressions this is the oldest known surviving heraldic representation in Germany. The panel was acquired by the Bayerisches Nationalmuseum in Munich in 1861.

Wies Church

The nearby pilgrimage church at Wies was closely connected to Steingaden Abbey. It was built under Abbot Marinus Mayer in 1745 when it became apparent that Wies had become an important centre of pilgrimage, and has continued ever since as one of the most popular pilgrimage churches in Bavaria.

Notes

External links

 Klöster in Bayern 

Premonstratensian monasteries in Germany
Monasteries in Bavaria
1140s establishments in the Holy Roman Empire
1147 establishments in Europe
Religious organizations established in the 1140s
Christian monasteries established in the 12th century
Burial sites of the House of Welf
Weilheim-Schongau